Klaus Wagner (16 January 1922 – 16 August 2001) was a German equestrian. He competed in equestrian at the 1952 Summer Olympics in Helsinki, where he won a silver medal in the team eventing, and placed fifth in the individual contest. He competed in equestrian at the 1956 Summer Olympics in Stockholm, where he won a silver medal in the team competition in eventing (along with August Lütke-Westhues  and Otto Rothe).

References

1922 births
2001 deaths
German male equestrians
Equestrians at the 1952 Summer Olympics
Equestrians at the 1956 Summer Olympics
Equestrians at the 1960 Summer Olympics
Equestrians at the 1968 Summer Olympics
Olympic equestrians of the United Team of Germany
Olympic equestrians of West Germany